The Visa Waiver Program Improvement and Terrorist Travel Prevention Act of 2015 also called H.R.158 is a bill passed by the House of Representatives on December 9, 2015, and signed by president Barack Obama into law.

Under this bill, citizens of seven countries, all except one are Muslims majority countries, who holds multiple citizenships are barred from entering Visa Waiver Program even if one of their citizenship is included in Visa waiver program. These countries are  Iraq, North Korea, Syria, Iran, Sudan, Libya, Somalia, Yemen.

History 
After the November 2015 Paris attacks, there were concerns in the US to tighten its border security. It prompted Obama to call on congress to change the Visa waiver program to combat terrorism.

The Visa Waiver Program Improvement and Terrorist Travel Prevention Act originally affected four countries: Iraq, Syria, and countries on the State Sponsors of Terrorism list (Iran and Sudan). Foreigners who were nationals of those countries, or who had visited those countries since 2011, were required to obtain a visa to enter the United States, even if they were nationals or dual-nationals of the 38 countries participating in the Visa Waiver Program. Libya, Yemen, and Somalia were added later as "countries of concern" by Secretary of Homeland Security Jeh Johnson during the Obama administration. The executive order refers to these countries as "countries designated pursuant to Division O, Title II, Section 203 of the 2016 consolidated Appropriations Act". Prior to this, in 2011, additional background checks were imposed on the nationals of Iraq.

Some civil liberties groups expressed concern to base a law on nationality.

American Civil Liberties Union writes: "We urge Congress to exercise caution and to avoid passing legislation that would broadly scapegoat groups based on nationality, and would fan the flames of discriminatory exclusion, both here and abroad"

Atossa Araxia Abrahamian in article in The New York Times writes: "All countries should do their best to stop people who pose a genuine security threat, regardless of what papers they may carry. But ascribing guilt by association isn’t the way to do it" 

It was also pointed out that citizens of theses countries were not part of any terrorist attack in US.

Later  Donald Trump used it as base  for Executive Order 13769

See also 
 Trump travel ban

References 

Policies of Barack Obama
United States federal immigration and nationality legislation
Counterterrorism in the United States